Hamed Coulibaly (born 16 December 1996) is an Ivorian professional footballer who plays as a centre-back.

Career
Coulibaly left KuPS at the end of 2018.

References

1996 births
Living people
Ivorian footballers
Kuopion Palloseura players
SC Kuopio Futis-98 players
IFK Mariehamn players
Voltigeurs de Châteaubriant players
Veikkausliiga players
Kakkonen players
Championnat National 3 players
Association football defenders
Ivorian expatriate footballers
Ivorian expatriate sportspeople in Finland
Ivorian expatriate sportspeople in France
Expatriate footballers in Finland
Expatriate footballers in France